The Trio for piano, flute and bassoon in G major, WoO. 37 is a composition for piano trio by Ludwig van Beethoven that was discovered amongst Beethoven's papers following his death. Believed to have been composed in his teens and demonstrating the influence of Mozart, the composition remained unpublished until 1888, when it was published in the supplement to the complete set of the composers works by Breitkopf & Härtel.

Background

According to Cooper, Beethoven composed the work around 1786, when he was 15 years old. The intended recipient is supposed to be the Count Friedrich Von Westerholt, an amateur bassoonist, whose daughter Anna Maria was taking piano lessons from Beethoven.

Instrumentation

The composition is scored for piano, flute, and bassoon.

Movements

The composition is in three movements:

 Allegro
 Adagio
 Thema Andante con Variazioni

A typical performance takes around 26 minutes.

References
Notes

Sources

External links
 
 

Piano trios by Ludwig van Beethoven
Chamber music by Ludwig van Beethoven
1786 compositions
Compositions in G major
Beethoven
Beethoven
Beethoven
Compositions by Ludwig van Beethoven published posthumously